The 2001 Cleveland Indians season was the 101st season for the franchise.

Offseason
 December 28, 2000: Fausto Carmona was signed by the Indians as an amateur free agent.
 January 9, 2001: Juan González was signed as a free agent by the Indians.

Regular season
 August 5, 2001: The Impossible Return – Notably, the Indians tied a Major League Baseball record by erasing a 12-run Seattle lead. Thus, despite its relatively low-profile as a regular season match, the game is vividly remembered and beloved around Cleveland today. For Seattle fans, it is not only a source of angst because of the game itself but because, had the Mariners held on, they would have broken the all-time Major League record for most wins in a season, instead of tying the 1906 Chicago Cubs with 116 wins.

The number 455 was honored after the Indians sold out 455 consecutive games between 1995 and 2001, an MLB record at the time, subsequently broken by the Boston Red Sox on September 8, 2008.

Season standings

Record vs. opponents

Notable transactions
 June 22, 2001: Steve Karsay and Steve Reed were traded by the Indians to the Atlanta Braves for John Rocker and Troy Cameron (minors).
 July 31, 2001: Zach Day was traded by the Indians to the Montreal Expos for Milton Bradley.

Roster

Game log

|- bgcolor="#ffbbbb"
| 18 || April 24 || Angels || 2–7 || Schoeneweis (2–1) || Colón (2–2) || || Jacobs Field || 31,942 || 11–7 || L1
|- bgcolor="#ffbbbb"
| 19 || April 25 || Angels || 1–3 || Valdez (1–2) || Sabathia (2–1) || Percival (3) || Jacobs Field || 31,396 || 11–8 || L2
|- bgcolor="#bbffbb"
| 20 || April 26 || Angels || 6–5 || Shuey (1–1) || Hasegawa (1–2) ||  Wickman (4) || Jacobs Field || 29,427 || 12–8 || W1
|-

|- bgcolor="#bbffbb"
| 39 || May 18 || @ Angels || 7–2 || Burba (6–2) || Rapp (1–4) || || Edison International Field of Anaheim || 39,177 || 27–12 || W1
|- bgcolor="#bbffbb"
| 40 || May 19 || @ Angels || 4–3 (10) || Shuey (3–1) || Percival (2–1) || Wickman (7) || Edison International Field of Anaheim || 40,019 || 28–12 || W2
|- bgcolor="#ffbbbb"
| 41 || May 20 || @ Angels || 6–9 || Levine (2–2) || Rodriguez (1–1) || Percival (10) || Edison International Field of Anaheim || 36,339 || 28–13 || L1
|-

|- bgcolor="#ffbbbb"
| 121 || August 17 || Angels || 2–7 || Ortiz (11–7) || Nagy (4–6) || || Jacobs Field || 42,528 || 68–53 || L1
|- bgcolor="#bbffbb"
| 122 || August 18 || Angels || 4–2 || Sabathia (13–4) || Rapp (5–10) || Wickman (21) || Jacobs Field || 42,610 || 69–53 || W1
|- bgcolor="#ffbbbb"
| 123 || August 19 || Angels || 1–4 || Washburn (11–6) || Colón (10–9) || Percival (35) || Jacobs Field || 42,510 || 69–54 || L1
|-

|- style="text-align:center;"
| Legend:       = Win       = Loss       = PostponementBold = Indians team member

|-  style="text-align:center; background:#fbb;"
| 1 || April 2 || White Sox || 7 – 4 || Wells (1-0) || Colón (0-1) || Foulke (1) || 42,606 || 0-1
|-  style="text-align:center; background:#bfb;"
| 2 || April 4 || White Sox || 8 – 4 || Finley (1-0) || Eldred (0-1) || || 32,763 || 1-1
|-  style="text-align:center; background:#bfb;"
| 3 || April 6 || Orioles || 4 – 3 || Rincón (1-0) || Mercedes (0-1) || Wickman (1) || 32,738 || 2-1
|-  style="text-align:center; background:#fbb;"
| 4 || April 7 || Orioles || 4 – 2 (11) || Trombley (1-0) || Reed (0-1) || Kohlmeier (1) || 40,704 || 2-2
|-  style="text-align:center; background:#bfb;"
| 5 || April 8 || Orioles || 4 – 3 || Speier (1-0) || Maduro (0-1) || Wickman (2) || 40,754 || 3-2
|-  style="text-align:center; background:#fbb;"
| 6 || April 9 || @ White Sox || 9 – 2 || Biddle (1-0) || Finley (1-1) || || 21,242 || 3-3
|-  style="text-align:center; background:#fbb;"
| 7 || April 10 || @ White Sox || 8 – 7 || Glover (1-0) || Shuey (0-1) || Foulke (2) || 12,465 || 3-4
|-  style="text-align:center; background:#fbb;"
| 8 || April 11 || @ White Sox || 7 – 6 || Lowe (1-0) || Burba (0-1) || Foulke (3) || 12,693 || 3-5
|-  style="text-align:center; background:#bfb;"
| 9 || April 12 || @ Tigers || 5 – 3 || Colón (1-1) || Holt (1-1) || Wickman (3) || 15,639 || 4-5
|-  style="text-align:center; background:#bfb;"
| 10 || April 13 || @ Tigers || 9 – 8 || Sabathia (1-0) || Weaver (1-2) || Shuey (1) || 20,334 || 5-5
|-  style="text-align:center; background:#fbb;"
| 11 || April 14 || @ Tigers || 1 – 0 || Sparks (1-1) || Finley (1-2) || || 23,119 || 5-6
|-  style="text-align:center; background:#bbb;"
|  || April 15 || @ Tigers || colspan=6|Postponed (rain) Rescheduled for July 28
|-  style="text-align:center; background:#bfb;"
| 12 || April 17 || @ Orioles || 8 – 1 || Burba (1-1) || Mercedes (0-3) || || 28,679 || 6-6
|-  style="text-align:center; background:#bfb;"
| 13 || April 18 || @ Orioles || 4 – 1 || Colón (2-1) || Hentgen (0-2) || || 28,801 || 7-6
|-  style="text-align:center; background:#bfb;"
| 14 || April 19 || @ Orioles || 11 – 5 || Sabathia (2-0) || McElroy (0-1) || || 34,100 || 8-6
|-  style="text-align:center; background:#bfb;"
| 15 || April 20 || Tigers || 5 – 4 || Wickman (1-0) || Nitkowski (0-1) || || 33,127 || 9-6
|-  style="text-align:center; background:#bfb;"
| 16 || April 21 || Tigers || 5 – 4 (11) || Reed (1-1) || Jones (0-2) || || 42,068 || 10-6
|-  style="text-align:center; background:#bfb;"
| 17 || April 22 || Tigers || 11 – 3 || Burba (2-1) || Mlicki (0-2) || || 34,125 || 11-6
|-  style="text-align:center; background:#fbb;"
| 18 || April 24 || Angels || 7 – 2 || Schoeneweis (2-1) || Colón (2-2) || || 31,942 || 11-7
|-  style="text-align:center; background:#fbb;"
| 19 || April 25 || Angels || 3 – 1 || Valdez (1-2) || Sabathia (2-1) || Percival (3) || 31,396 || 11-8
|-  style="text-align:center; background:#bfb;"
| 20 || April 26 || Angels || 6 – 5 || Shuey (1-1) || Hasegawa (1-2) || Wickman (4) || 29,427 || 12-8
|-  style="text-align:center; background:#fbb;"
| 21 || April 27 || Rangers || 11 – 9 || Mahomes (1-2) || Drew (0-1) || Zimmerman (2) || 40,320 || 12-9
|-  style="text-align:center; background:#bfb;"
| 22 || April 28 || Rangers || 7 – 3 || Burba (3-1) || Helling (1-4) || || 41,147 || 13-9
|-  style="text-align:center; background:#bfb;"
| 23 || April 29 || Rangers || 9 – 2 || Colón (3-2) || Davis (2-2) || || 40,132 || 14-9
|-

|-  style="text-align:center; background:#bfb;"
| 24 || May 1 || @ Royals || 13 – 2 || Finley (2-2) || Durbin (0-1) || || 14,512 || 15-9
|-  style="text-align:center; background:#bfb;"
| 25 || May 2 || @ Royals || 8 – 4 || Sabathia (3-1) || Suzuki (2-2) || || 13,401 || 16-9
|-  style="text-align:center; background:#bfb;"
| 26 || May 3 || @ Royals || 9 – 4 || Burba (4-1) || Reichert (3-2) || || 23,869 || 17-9
|-  style="text-align:center; background:#bfb;"
| 27 || May 4 || @ Devil Rays || 8 – 6 || Colón (4-2) || Lopez (3-3) || Shuey (2) || 16,478 || 18-9
|-  style="text-align:center; background:#bfb;"
| 28 || May 5 || @ Devil Rays || 9 – 4 || Speier (2-0) || Wilson (1-4) || || 16,180 || 19-9
|-  style="text-align:center; background:#bfb;"
| 29 || May 6 || @ Devil Rays || 10 – 3 || Finley (3-2) || Creek (1-1) || || 19,511 || 20-9
|-  style="text-align:center; background:#bfb;"
| 30 || May 8 || Royals || 8 – 4 || Burba (5-1) || Cogan (0-2) || || 31,537 || 21-9
|-  style="text-align:center; background:#bfb;"
| 31 || May 9 || Royals || 5 – 1 || Sabathia (4-1) || Reichert (3-3) || || 32,664 || 22-9
|-  style="text-align:center; background:#fbb;"
| 32 || May 10 || Royals || 8 – 3 || Meadows (1-4) || Colón (4-3) || || 34,502 || 22-10
|-  style="text-align:center; background:#bfb;"
| 33 || May 11 || Devil Rays || 10 – 6 || Rodriguez (1-0) || Rekar (0-5) || || 42,009 || 23-10
|-  style="text-align:center; background:#bfb;"
| 34 || May 12 || Devil Rays || 8 – 0 || Finley (4-2) || Rose (0-1) || || 40,399 || 24-10
|-  style="text-align:center; background:#fbb;"
| 35 || May 13 || Devil Rays || 7 – 0 || Sturtze (1-2) || Burba (5-2) || || 41,399 || 24-11
|-  style="text-align:center; background:#bfb;"
| 36 || May 15 || @ Rangers || 8 – 6 || Sabathia (5-1) || Davis (2-4) || Wickman (5) || 39,348 || 25-11
|-  style="text-align:center; background:#bfb;"
| 37 || May 16 || @ Rangers || 4 – 3 || Shuey (2-1) || Crabtree (0-2) || Wickman (6) || 33,695 || 26-11
|-  style="text-align:center; background:#fbb;"
| 38 || May 17 || @ Rangers || 12 – 7 || Rogers (2-3) || Finley (4-3) || || 37,191 || 26-12
|-  style="text-align:center; background:#bfb;"
| 39 || May 18 || @ Angels || 7 – 2 || Burba (6-2) || Rapp (1-4) || || 39,177 || 27-12
|-  style="text-align:center; background:#bfb;"
| 40 || May 19 || @ Angels || 4 – 3 (10) || Shuey (3-1) || Percival (2-1) || Wickman (7) || 40,019 || 28-12
|-  style="text-align:center; background:#fbb;"
| 41 || May 20 || @ Angels || 9 – 6 || Levine (2-2) || Rodriguez (1-1) || Percival (10) || 36,339 || 28-13
|-  style="text-align:center; background:#fbb;"
| 42 || May 22 || Tigers || 3 – 0 || Weaver (4-5) || Colón (4-4) || Jones (10) || 35,362 || 28-14
|-  style="text-align:center; background:#bfb;"
| 43 || May 23 || Tigers || 4 – 3 (10) || Wickman (2-0) || Borkowski (0-1) || || 36,804 || 29-14
|-  style="text-align:center; background:#bfb;"
| 44 || May 24 || Tigers || 8 – 5 || Burba (7-2) || Santos (1-1) || Wickman (8) || 36,295 || 30-14
|-  style="text-align:center; background:#bfb;"
| 45 || May 25 || Yankees || 6 – 4 || Rodriguez (2-1) || Hernández (0-5) || Wickman (9) || 42,455 || 31-14
|-  style="text-align:center; background:#fbb;"
| 46 || May 26 || Yankees || 12 – 5 || Clemens (5-1) || Sabathia (5-2) || || 42,528 || 31-15
|-  style="text-align:center; background:#fbb;"
| 47 || May 27 || Yankees || 6 – 2 || Lilly (2-0) || Colón (4-5) || Rivera (14) || 42,570 || 31-16
|-  style="text-align:center; background:#fbb;"
| 48 || May 28 || @ Tigers || 12 – 6 || Sparks (3-2) || Finley (4-4) || || 24,615 || 31-17
|-  style="text-align:center; background:#bfb;"
| 49 || May 29 || @ Tigers || 6 – 4 || Shuey (4-1) || Murray (0-2) || Wickman (10) || 21,404 || 32-17
|-  style="text-align:center; background:#bfb;"
| 50 || May 30 || @ Tigers || 8 – 4 || Wright (1-0) || Holt (4-4) || Wickman (11) || 18,359 || 33-17
|-

|-  style="text-align:center; background:#bfb;"
| 51 || June 1 || @ Yankees || 7 – 4 (6) || Sabathia (6-2) || Lilly (2-1) || Rincón (1) || 42,032 || 34-17
|-  style="text-align:center; background:#fbb;"
| 52 || June 2 || @ Yankees || 9 – 4 || Clemens (6-1) || Colón (4-6) || Rivera (16) || 46,618 || 34-18
|-  style="text-align:center; background:#bfb;"
| 53 || June 3 || @ Yankees || 4 – 3 || Nagy (1-0) || Pettitte (6-4) || Wickman (12) || 47,300 || 35-18
|-  style="text-align:center; background:#fbb;"
| 54 || June 4 || @ Twins || 11 – 10 || Guardado (5-0) || Shuey (4-2) || || 20,613 || 35-19
|-  style="text-align:center; background:#bfb;"
| 55 || June 5 || @ Twins || 5 – 0 || Wright (2-0) || Romero (1-2) || || 22,022 || 36-19
|-  style="text-align:center; background:#bfb;"
| 56 || June 6 || @ Twins || 5 – 2 || Shuey (5-2) || Cressend (2-1) || Wickman (13) || 24,031 || 37-19
|-  style="text-align:center; background:#bfb;"
| 57 || June 7 || @ Twins || 6 – 2 || Colón (5-6) || Radke (7-2) || || 24,671 || 38-19
|-  style="text-align:center; background:#fbb;"
| 58 || June 8 || Reds || 7 – 4 || Brower (3-3) || Rodriguez (2-2) || Graves (14) || 42,512 || 38-20
|-  style="text-align:center; background:#bfb;"
| 59 || June 9 || Reds || 10 – 2 || Burba (8-2) || Fernández (5-6) || || 42,521 || 39-20
|-  style="text-align:center; background:#fbb;"
| 60 || June 10 || Reds || 9 – 3 || Reitsma (3-5) || Wright (2-1) || || 49,479 || 39-21
|-  style="text-align:center; background:#fbb;"
| 61 || June 12 || Brewers || 4 – 2 || Fox (2-0) || Shuey (5-3) || Leskanic (7) || 39,192 || 39-22
|-  style="text-align:center; background:#bfb;"
| 62 || June 13 || Brewers || 5 – 2 (10) || Wickman (3-0) || Fox (2-1) || || 35,679 || 40-22
|-  style="text-align:center; background:#fbb;"
| 63 || June 14 || Brewers || 9 – 4 || Sheets (7-4) || Nagy (1-1) || || 41,610 || 40-23
|-  style="text-align:center; background:#fbb;"
| 64 || June 15 || @ Pirates || 6 – 3 || Anderson (4-6) || Burba (8-3) || Williams (12) || 36,235 || 40-24
|-  style="text-align:center; background:#fbb;"
| 65 || June 16 || @ Pirates || 6 – 4 || Schmidt (3-2) || Wright (2-2) || Williams (13) || 37,056 || 40-25
|-  style="text-align:center; background:#fbb;"
| 66 || June 17 || @ Pirates || 1 – 0 || Ritchie (2-8) || Karsay (0-1) || || 36,694 || 40-26
|-  style="text-align:center; background:#fbb;"
| 67 || June 19 || Twins || 10 – 9 (12) || Wells (5-2) || Nagy (1-2) || || 39,190 || 40-27
|-  style="text-align:center; background:#bfb;"
| 68 || June 20 || Twins || 4 – 2 || Westbrook (1-0) || Mays (8-5) || Wickman (14) || 40,213 || 41-27
|-  style="text-align:center; background:#bfb;"
| 69 || June 21 || Twins || 9 – 6 (7) || Woodard (1-0) || Romero (1-4) || Rincón (2) || 39,755 || 42-27
|-  style="text-align:center; background:#bfb;"
| 70 || June 22 || @ Royals || 6 – 5 || Sabathia (7-2) || Stein (3-6) || Wickman (15) || 31,572 || 43-27
|-  style="text-align:center; background:#fbb;"
| 71 || June 23 || @ Royals || 3 – 2 || Durbin (5-6) || Burba (8-4) || Hernández (13) || 29,808 || 43-28
|-  style="text-align:center; background:#bfb;"
| 72 || June 24 || @ Royals || 4 – 2 || Colón (6-6) || Suppan (3-7) || Rocker (1) || 25,127 || 44-28
|-  style="text-align:center; background:#fbb;"
| 73 || June 25 || @ Yankees || 8 – 7 || Witasick (1-0) || Rincón (1-1) || Rivera (24) || 40,852 || 44-29
|-  style="text-align:center; background:#bfb;"
| 74 || June 26 || @ Yankees || 5 – 3 || Nagy (2-2) || Hernández (0-2) || Rocker (2) || 40,346 || 45-29
|-  style="text-align:center; background:#fbb;"
| 75 || June 27 || @ Yankees || 15 – 5 || Mussina (8-7) || Sabathia (7-3) || || 45,539 || 45-30
|-  style="text-align:center; background:#fbb;"
| 76 || June 29 || Royals || 5 – 3 || Suppan (4-7) || Burba (8-5) || Hernández (14) || 42,500 || 45-31
|-  style="text-align:center; background:#fbb;"
| 77 || June 30 || Royals || 11 – 7 || Wilson (2-0) || Colón (6-7) || || 42,446 || 45-32
|-

|-  style="text-align:center; background:#fbb;"
| 78 || July 1 || Royals || 13-11 || Stein (4-6) || Nagy (2-3) || Hernández (15) || 42,457 || 45-33
|-  style="text-align:center; background:#bfb;"
| 79 || July 2 || Royals || 2 – 1 || Rocker (1-0) || Cogan (0-3) || || 40,248 || 46-33
|-  style="text-align:center; background:#bfb;"
| 80 || July 3 || Red Sox || 9 – 1 || Westbrook (2-0) || Ohka (2-3) || || 42,520 || 47-33
|-  style="text-align:center; background:#fbb;"
| 81 || July 4 || Red Sox || 13 – 4 || Wakefield (6-2) || Burba (8-6) || || 42,382 || 47-34
|-  style="text-align:center; background:#fbb;"
| 82 || July 5 || Red Sox || 5 – 4 || Lowe (4-6) || Rocker (1-1) || || 42,647 || 47-35
|-  style="text-align:center; background:#bfb;"
| 83 || July 6 || Cardinals || 14 – 2 || Nagy (3-3) || Morris (10-5) || || 42,394 || 48-35
|-  style="text-align:center; background:#bfb;"
| 84 || July 7 || Cardinals || 7 – 6 (10) || Rocker (2-1) || Veres (0-1) || || 42.467 || 49-35
|-  style="text-align:center; background:#fbb;"
| 85 || July 8 || Cardinals || 4 – 3 || Timlin (3-4) || Rocker (2-2) || || 42,431 || 49-36
|-  style="text-align:center; background:#bfb;"
| 86 || July 12 || @ Reds || 7 – 0 || Colón (7-7) || Reitsma (4-8) || || 28,816 || 50-36
|-  style="text-align:center; background:#bfb;"
| 87 || July 13 || @ Reds || 5 – 1 || Sabathia (8-3) || Dessens (6-7) || || 38,790 || 51-36
|-  style="text-align:center; background:#fbb;"
| 88 || July 14 || @ Reds || 6 – 5 (13) || Graves (3-2) || Rocker (2-3) || || 40,794 || 51-37
|-  style="text-align:center; background:#fbb;"
| 89 || July 15 || @ Astros || 5 – 3 || Redding (2-0) || Westbrook (2-1) || Wagner (20) || 39,127 || 51-38
|-  style="text-align:center; background:#fbb;"
| 90 || July 16 || @ Astros || 10 – 8 || Villone (3-3) || Rocker (2-4) || || 30,834 || 51-39
|-  style="text-align:center; background:#bfb;"
| 91 || July 17 || @ Astros || 10 – 4 || Colón (8-7) || Reynolds (8-9) || || 32,284 || 52-39
|-  style="text-align:center; background:#bfb;"
| 92 || July 18 || @ White Sox || 9 – 4 || Sabathia (9-3) || Buehrle (7-5) || || 22,634 || 53-39
|-  style="text-align:center; background:#bfb;"
| 93 || July 19 || @ White Sox || 10 – 3 || Burba (9-6) || Lowe (5-2) || || 23,450 || 54-39
|-  style="text-align:center; background:#fbb;"
| 94 || July 20 || Tigers || 7 – 3 || Holt (7-7) || Westbrook (2-2) || || 42,520 || 54-40
|-  style="text-align:center; background:#bfb;"
| 95 || July 21 || Tigers || 8 – 4 || Nagy (4-3) || Pettyjohn (0-2) || || 42,316 || 55-40
|-  style="text-align:center; background:#bfb;"
| 96 || July 22 || Tigers || 6 – 3 || Colón (9-7) || Weaver (9-9) || || 42,462 || 56-40
|-  style="text-align:center; background:#bfb;"
| 97 || July 23 || White Sox || 2 – 0 || Sabathia (10-3) || Buehrle (7-6) || Wickman (16) || 41,317 || 57-40
|-  style="text-align:center; background:#fbb;"
| 98 || July 24 || White Sox || 4 – 1 || Lowe (6-2) || Burba (9-7) || Foulke (22) || 42,175 || 57-41
|-  style="text-align:center; background:#bfb;"
| 99 || July 25 || White Sox || 7 – 5 || Westbrook (3-2) || Biddle (2-7) || Wickman (17) || 42,645 || 58-41
|-  style="text-align:center; background:#fbb;"
| 100 || July 26 || White Sox || 5 – 4 || Ginter (1-0) || Nagy (4-4) || Foulke (23) || 42,054 || 58-42
|-  style="text-align:center; background:#bfb;"
| 101 || July 27 || @ Tigers || 7 – 4 || Colón (10-7) || Pettyjohn (0-3) || Wickman (18) || 39,504 || 59-42
|-  style="text-align:center; background:#bfb;"
| 102 || July 28 || @ Tigers || 6 – 4 || Báez (1-0) || Murray (0-4) || Wickman (19) || 27,643 || 60-42
|-  style="text-align:center; background:#fbb;"
| 103 || July 28 || @ Tigers || 4 – 2 || Weaver (10-9) || Woodard (1-1) || Anderson (12) || 34,916 || 60-43
|-  style="text-align:center; background:#fbb;"
| 104 || July 29 || @ Tigers || 8 – 3 || Sparks (8-5) || Burba (9-8) || || 32,918 || 60-44
|-  style="text-align:center; background:#fbb;"
| 105 || July 31 || Athletics || 11 – 2 || Lidle (5-5) || Westbrook (3-3) || || 38,830 || 60-45
|-

|-  style="text-align:center; background:#bfb;"
| 106 || August 1 || Athletics || 6 – 5 || Báez (2-0) || Mecir (2-8) || Wickman (20) || 40,592 || 61-45
|-  style="text-align:center; background:#fbb;"
| 107 || August 2 || Athletics || 17 – 4 || Mulder (13-6) || Sabathia (10-4) || || 38,226 || 61-46
|-  style="text-align:center; background:#fbb;"
| 108 || August 3 || Mariners || 2 – 1 || Moyer (12-5) || Colón (10-8) || Sasaki (35) || 42,580 || 61-47
|-  style="text-align:center; background:#fbb;"
| 109 || August 4 || Mariners || 8 – 5 || García (13-3) || Báez (2-1) || Rhodes (3) || 42,440 || 61-48
|-  style="text-align:center; background:#bfb;"
| 110 || August 5 || Mariners || 15 -14 (11) || Rocker (3-4) || Paniagua (3-3) || || 42,494 || 62-48
|-  style="text-align:center; background:#fbb;"
| 111 || August 6 || Mariners || 8 – 6 || Abbott (12-2) || Nagy (4-5) || Paniagua (3) || 42,058 || 62-49
|-  style="text-align:center; background:#bfb;"
| 112 || August 7 || @ Twins || 7 – 2 || Sabathia (11-4) || Reed (1-1) || || 28,192 || 63-49
|-  style="text-align:center; background:#bfb;"
| 113 || August 8 || @ Twins || 8 – 2 (10) || Báez (3-1) || Wells (8-4) || || 38,444 || 64-49
|-  style="text-align:center; background:#fbb;"
| 114 || August 9 || @ Twins || 6 – 4 || Milton (11-4) || Finley (4-5) || Hawkins (27) || 30,080 || 64-50
|-  style="text-align:center; background:#fbb;"
| 115 || August 10 || @ Rangers || 7 – 2 || Davis (6-8) || Woodard (1-2) || || 47,242 || 64-51
|-  style="text-align:center; background:#fbb;"
| 116 || August 11 || @ Rangers || 6 – 5 || Petkovsek (1-1) || Rocker (3-5) || Zimmerman (22) || 43,145 || 64-52
|-  style="text-align:center; background:#bfb;"
| 117 || August 12 || @ Rangers || 13 – 2 || Sabathia (12-4) || Bell (4-2) || || 28,765 || 65-52
|-  style="text-align:center; background:#bfb;"
| 118 || August 14 || Twins || 8 – 7 (11) || Báez (4-1) || Wells (8-5) || || 42,619 || 66-52
|-  style="text-align:center; background:#bfb;"
| 119 || August 15 || Twins || 8 – 2 || Finley (5-5) || Mays (12-11) || || 41,602 || 67-52
|-  style="text-align:center; background:#bfb;"
| 120 || August 16 || Twins || 6 – 1 || Woodard (2-2) || Johnson (1-2) || || 40,672 || 68-52
|-  style="text-align:center; background:#fbb;"
| 121 || August 17 || Angels || 7 – 2 || Ortiz (11-7) || Nagy (4-6) || || 42,528 || 68-53
|-  style="text-align:center; background:#bfb;"
| 122 || August 18 || Angels || 4 – 2 || Sabathia (13-4) || Rapp (5-10) || Wickman (21) || 42,610 || 69-53
|-  style="text-align:center; background:#fbb;"
| 123 || August 19 || Angels || 4 – 1 || Washburn (11-6) || Colón (10-9) || Percival (35) || 42,510 || 69-54
|-  style="text-align:center; background:#fbb;"
| 124 || August 20 || @ Athletics || 9 – 0 || Zito (9-8) || Finley (5-6) || || 18,133 || 69-55
|-  style="text-align:center; background:#bfb;"
| 125 || August 21 || @ Athletics || 2 – 1 || Woodard (3-2) || Lidle (8-6) || Wickman (22) || 19,343 || 70-55
|-  style="text-align:center; background:#bfb;"
| 126 || August 22 || @ Athletics || 5 – 4 (11) || Wickman (4-0) || Vizcaíno (1-1) || Riske (1) || 40,992 || 71-55
|-  style="text-align:center; background:#bfb;"
| 127 || August 23 || @ Athletics || 9 – 7 || Nagy (5-6) || Mulder (15-7) || Wickman (23) || 22,281 || 72-55
|-  style="text-align:center; background:#fbb;"
| 128 || August 24 || @ Mariners || 4 – 1 || Moyer (15-5) || Colón (10-10) || Charlton (1) || 45,767 || 72-56
|-  style="text-align:center; background:#fbb;"
| 129 || August 25 || @ Mariners || 3 – 2 (11) || Halama (9-6) || Rocker (3-6) || || 45,818 || 72-57
|-  style="text-align:center; background:#bfb;"
| 130 || August 26 || @ Mariners || 4 – 3 || Riske (1-0) || Nelson (4-2) || Wickman (24) || 45,782 || 73-57
|-  style="text-align:center; background:#bfb;"
| 131 || August 28 || Red Sox || 8 – 3 || Burba (10-8) || Cone (8-3) || || 41,048 || 74-57
|-  style="text-align:center; background:#bfb;"
| 132 || August 29 || Red Sox || 2 – 1 || Sabathia (14-4) || Fossum (1-1) || Wickman (25) || 41,320 || 75-57
|-  style="text-align:center; background:#bfb;"
| 133 || August 30 || Red Sox || 3 – 1 || Colón (11-10) || Nomo (11-6) || Wickman (26) || 40,616 || 76-57
|-  style="text-align:center; background:#fbb;"
| 134 || August 31 || @ White Sox || 11 – 8 || Howry (4-5) || Westbrook (3-4) || Foulke (36) || 24,097 || 76-58
|-

|-  style="text-align:center; background:#bfb;"
| 135 || September 1 || @ White Sox || 4 – 3 || Drese (1-0) || Garland (6-5) || Wickman (27) || 27,869 || 77-58
|-  style="text-align:center; background:#fbb;"
| 136 || September 2 || @ White Sox || 19 – 10 || Biddle (6-8) || Burba (10-9) || || 25,680 || 77-59
|-  style="text-align:center; background:#bfb;"
| 137 || September 3 || @ White Sox || 6 – 3 || Sabathia (15-4) || Glover (4-2) || Wickman (28) || 28,135 || 78-59
|-  style="text-align:center; background:#bfb;"
| 138 || September 4 || @ Red Sox || 8 – 5 || Colón (12-10) || Nomo (11-7) || Wickman (29) || 32,145 || 79-59
|-  style="text-align:center; background:#fbb;"
| 139 || September 5 || @ Red Sox || 10 – 7 || Arrojo (4-3) || Woodard (3-3) || Urbina (5) || 32,029 || 79-60
|-  style="text-align:center; background:#bfb;"
| 140 || September 6 || @ Red Sox || 6 – 4 || Finley (6-6) || Castillo (8-8) || Rocker (3) || 32,500 || 80-60
|-  style="text-align:center; background:#fbb;"
| 141 || September 7 || White Sox || 10 – 7 || Biddle (7-8) || Burba (10-10) || Foulke (38) || 42,487 || 80-61
|-  style="text-align:center; background:#bfb;"
| 142 || September 8 || White Sox || 8 – 7 || Báez (5-1) || Foulke (3-8) || || 42,488 || 81-61
|-  style="text-align:center; background:#bfb;"
| 143 || September 9 || White Sox || 9 – 8 || Wickman (5-0) || Foulke (3-9) || || 42,377 || 82-61
|-  style="text-align:center; background:#fbb;"
| 144 || September 10 || White Sox || 7 – 1 || Wright (4-2) || Colón (12-11) || || 38,244 || 82-62
|-  style="text-align:center; background:#bbb;"
|  || September 11 || @ Royals || colspan=6|Postponed (September 11 attacks)
|-  style="text-align:center; background:#bfb;"
| 145 || September 18 || Royals || 11 – 2 || Finley (7-6) || Durbin (7-15) || || 34,795 || 83-62
|-  style="text-align:center; background:#bfb;"
| 146 || September 19 || Royals || 11 – 3 || Colón (13-11) || Suppan (9-12) || || 31,357 || 84-62
|-  style="text-align:center; background:#fbb;"
| 147 || September 20 || Royals || 4 – 2 || George (4-5) || Drese (1-1) || Hernández (24) || 33,912 || 84-63
|-  style="text-align:center; background:#fbb;"
| 148 || September 21 || @ Twins || 6 – 2 || Reed (4-3) || Sabathia (15-5) || Guardado (7) || 20,038 || 84-64
|-  style="text-align:center; background:#bfb;"
| 149 || September 22 || @ Twins || 4 – 2 || Rincón (2-1) || Radke (13-10) || Wickman (30) || 33,733 || 85-64
|-  style="text-align:center; background:#bfb;"
| 150 || September 23 || @ Twins || 4 – 2 || Finley (8-6) || Milton (14-7) || Wickman (31) || 21,928 || 86-64
|-  style="text-align:center; background:#fbb;"
| 151 || September 24 || Blue Jays || 3 – 2 (11) || File (4-3) || Báez (5-2) || Eyre (1) || 32,425 || 86-65
|-  style="text-align:center; background:#bfb;"
| 152 || September 25 || Blue Jays || 11 – 7 || Riske (2-0) || Plesac (4-5) || || 35,729 || 87-65
|-  style="text-align:center; background:#bbb;"
|  || September 26 || Blue Jays || colspan=6|Postponed (rain) Rescheduled for October 5
|-  style="text-align:center; background:#fbb;"
| 153 || September 28 || Twins || 1 – 0 || Milton (15-7) || Báez (5-3) || Guardado (9) || 41,319 || 87-66
|-  style="text-align:center; background:#bfb;"
| 154 || September 29 || Twins || 9 – 8 || Westbrook (4-4) || Guardado (7-1) || || 42,417 || 88-66
|-  style="text-align:center; background:#bfb;"
| 155 || September 30 || Twins || 9 – 1 || Colón (14-11) || Reed (4-5) || || 42,323 || 89-66
|-

|-  style="text-align:center; background:#fbb;"
| 156 || October 2 || @ Royals || 5 -1 || Hernández (5-6) || Rocker (3-7) || || 12,016 || 89-67
|-  style="text-align:center; background:#bfb;"
| 157 || October 3 || @ Royals || 4 – 1 || Sabathia (16-5) || MacDougal (1-1) || Wickman (32) || 12,581 || 90-67
|-  style="text-align:center; background:#fbb;"
| 158 || October 4 || @ Royals || 8 – 4 || Durbin (9-16) || Colón (14-12) || || 12,672 || 90-68
|-  style="text-align:center; background:#fbb;"
| 159 || October 5 || @ Blue Jays || 5 – 0 || Halladay (5-3) || Finley (8-7) || || || 90-69
|-  style="text-align:center; background:#fbb;"
| 160 || October 5 || @ Blue Jays || 4 – 3 (11) || File (5-3) || Drese (1-2) || || 19,387 || 90-70
|-  style="text-align:center; background:#fbb;"
| 161 || October 6 || @ Blue Jays || 5 – 2 || Carpenter (11-11) || Drew (0-2) || Quantrill (2) || 20,762 || 90-71
|-  style="text-align:center; background:#bfb;"
| 162 || October 7 || @ Blue Jays || 3 – 2 || Sabathia (17-5) || Lyon (5-4) || Rocker (4) || 28,217 || 91-71
|-

|-  style="text-align:center; background:#bfb;"
| 1 || October 9 || @ Mariners || 5 – 0 || Colón (1-0) || García (0-1) || || 48,033 || 1-0
|-  style="text-align:center; background:#fbb;"
| 2 || October 11 || @ Mariners || 5 – 1 || Moyer (1-0) || Finley (0-1) || || 48,052 || 1-1
|-  style="text-align:center; background:#bfb;"
| 3 || October 13 || Mariners || 17 – 2 || Sabathia (1-0) || Sele (0-1) || || 45,069 || 2-1
|-  style="text-align:center; background:#fbb;"
| 4 || October 14 || Mariners || 6 – 2 || García (1-1) || Colón (1-1) || || 45,025 || 2-2
|-  style="text-align:center; background:#fbb;"
| 5 || October 15 || @ Mariners || 3 – 1 || Moyer (2-0) || Finley (0-2) || Sasaki (1) || 47,867 || 2-3
|-

Player stats

Batting

Starters by position
Note: Pos = Position; G = Games played; AB = At bats; R = Runs scored; H = Hits; 2B = Doubles; 3B = Triples; HR = Home runs; RBI = Runs batted in; AVG = Batting average; SB = Stolen bases

Other batters
Note: G = Games played; AB = At bats; R = Runs scored; H = Hits; 2B = Doubles; 3B = Triples; HR = Home runs; RBI = Runs batted in; AVG = Batting average; SB = Stolen bases

Note: Pitchers' batting statistics are not included above.

Pitching

Starting pitchers
Note: W = Wins; L = Losses; ERA = Earned run average; G = Games pitched; GS = Games started; IP = Innings pitched; H = Hits allowed; BB = Walks allowed; K = Strikeouts

Other pitchers
Note: W = Wins; L = Losses; ERA = Earned run average; G = Games pitched; GS = Games started; SV = Saves; IP = Innings pitched; H = Hits allowed; BB = Walks allowed; K = Strikeouts

Relief pitchers
Note: W = Wins; L = Losses; ERA = Earned run average; G = Games pitched; SV = Saves; IP = Innings pitched; H = Hits allowed; BB = Walks allowed; K = Strikeouts

ALDS
Seattle Mariners vs. Cleveland Indians
Series Summary:
Game 1 @ Safeco Field: Indians 5, Mariners 0
Game 2 @ Safeco Field: Mariners 5, Indians 1
Game 3 @ Jacobs Field: Indians 17, Mariners 2
Game 4 @ Jacobs Field: Mariners 6, Indians 2
Game 5 @ Safeco Field: Mariners 3, Indians 1
Mariners win series 3-2

Game 1

Game 2

Game 3

Game 4

Game 5

Award winners

All-Star Game
 Juan Gonzalez, right field, starter
 Roberto Alomar, second base, reserve

Minor league affiliates

Notes

References
2001 Cleveland Indians at Baseball Reference
2001 Cleveland Indians at Baseball Almanac

Cleveland Guardians seasons
Cleveland Indians season
American League Central champion seasons
Cleveland Indians